ISO 3166-1 (Codes for the representation of names of countries and their subdivisions – Part 1: Country codes) is a standard defining codes for the names of countries, dependent territories, and special areas of geographical interest. It is the first part of the ISO 3166 standard published by the International Organization for Standardization.

It defines three sets of country codes:
 ISO 3166-1 alpha-2 – two-letter country codes which are the most widely used of the three, and used most prominently for the Internet's country code top-level domains (with a few exceptions).
 ISO 3166-1 alpha-3 – three-letter country codes which allow a better visual association between the codes and the country names than the alpha-2 codes.
 ISO 3166-1 numeric – three-digit country codes which are identical to those developed and maintained by the United Nations Statistics Division, with the advantage of script (writing system) independence, and hence useful for people or systems using non-Latin scripts.

The alphabetic country codes were first included in ISO 3166 in 1974, and the numeric country codes were first included in 1981. The country codes have been published as ISO 3166-1 since 1997, when ISO 3166 was expanded into three parts, with ISO 3166-2 defining codes for subdivisions and ISO 3166-3 defining codes for former countries.

As a widely used international standard, ISO 3166-1 is implemented in other standards and used by international organizations to allow facilitation of the exchange of goods and information. However, it is not the only standard for country codes. Other country codes used by many international organizations are partly or totally incompatible with ISO 3166-1, although some of them closely correspond to ISO 3166-1 codes.

Criteria for inclusion

Currently 249 countries, territories, or areas of geographical interest are assigned official codes in ISO 3166-1. According to the ISO 3166 Maintenance Agency (ISO 3166/MA), the only way to enter a new country name into ISO 3166-1 is to have it registered in one of the following two sources:
 United Nations Terminology Bulletin Country Names, or
 Country and Region Codes for Statistical Use of the United Nations Statistics Division.

To be listed in the bulletin Country Names, a country must be at least one of the following:

 A member state of the United Nations
 A member of one of its specialized agencies
 A party to the Statute of the International Court of Justice

The list of names in Country and Region Codes for Statistical Use of the UN Statistics Division is based on the bulletin Country Names and other UN sources.

Once a country name or territory name appears in either of these two sources, it will be added to ISO 3166-1 by default.

The ISO 3166/MA may reserve code elements for other entities that do not qualify for inclusion based on the above criteria. For example, because the European Union is not a country, it is not formally included in ISO 3166-1, but for practical reasons, the ISO 3166/MA has "reserved the two-letter combination  for the purpose of identifying the European Union within the framework of ISO 3166-1".

Information included

ISO 3166-1 is published officially in both English and French. Since the second edition of ISO 3166-1, the following columns are included for each entry:
 Country Name – English (or French) short name (all upper-case)
 English (or French) short name lower case (title case)
 English (or French) full name
 Alpha-2 code
 Alpha-3 code
 Numeric code
 Remarks
 Independent
 Additional information: Administrative language(s) alpha-2 code element(s)
 Additional information: Administrative language(s) alpha-3 code element(s)
 Additional information: Local short name(s)

Naming and code construction

Naming and disputes

The country names used in ISO 3166-1 are taken from the two UN sources mentioned above. Some country names used by the UN, and accordingly by ISO, are subject to dispute:

Coding

The codes are chosen, according to the ISO 3166/MA, "to reflect the significant, unique component of the country name in order to allow a visual association between country name and country code". For this reason, common components of country names like "Republic", "Kingdom", "United", "Federal" or "Democratic" are normally not used for deriving the code elements. Some codes are chosen based on the native names of the countries. For example, Germany is assigned the alpha-2 code , based on its native name "Deutschland".

Current codes

Officially assigned code elements
The following is a complete ISO 3166-1 encoding list of the countries which are assigned official codes. It is listed in alphabetical order by the country's English short name used by the ISO 3166/MA.

Note: Each country's alpha-2 code is linked to more information about the assignment of its code elements.

Reserved and user-assigned code elements

Besides the officially assigned codes, code elements may be expanded by using either reserved codes or user-assigned codes.

Reserved code elements are codes which have become obsolete, or are required in order to enable a particular user application of the standard but do not qualify for inclusion in ISO 3166-1. To avoid transitional application problems and to aid users who require specific additional code elements for the functioning of their coding systems, the ISO 3166/MA, when justified, reserves these codes which it undertakes not to use for other than specified purposes during a limited or indeterminate period of time. Codes are usually reserved for former countries, overseas territories, international organizations, and special nationality status. The reserved alpha-2 and alpha-3 codes can be divided into the following four categories (click on the links for the reserved codes of each category):
 Alpha-2: exceptional reservations, transitional reservations, indeterminate reservations, and codes currently agreed not to use
 Alpha-3: exceptional reservations, transitional reservations, indeterminate reservations, and codes currently agreed not to use
 Numeric: no reserved codes

User-assigned code elements are codes at the disposal of users who need to add further names of countries, territories, or other geographical entities to their in-house application of ISO 3166-1, and the ISO 3166/MA will never use these codes in the updating process of the standard. The following codes can be user-assigned:
 Numeric:  to

User-assigned codes in wide use

 : Used to denote Northern Ireland for the purposes of VAT collection in trade between it and the European Union.

Changes

The ISO 3166/MA updates ISO 3166-1 when necessary. A country is usually assigned new ISO 3166-1 codes if it changes its name or its territorial boundaries. In general, new alphabetic codes are assigned if a country changes a significant part of its name, while a new numeric code is assigned if a country changes its territorial boundaries. Codes for formerly used country names that were deleted from ISO 3166-1 are published in ISO 3166-3.

ISO used to announce changes in newsletters which updated the currently valid standard, and releasing new editions which comprise a consolidation of newsletter changes. As of July 2013, changes are published in the online catalogue of ISO only, and no newsletters are published anymore. Past newsletters remain available through the search option on the ISO website.

See also

Country code
International Organization for Standardization
ISO 3166
ISO 3166-1
ISO 3166-2
ISO 3166-3
List of ISO 3166 country codes
International vehicle registration code
Country code top-level domain
List of Internet top-level domains

 ISO 639 – Codes for the representation of names of languages
Lists of countries and territories
Sovereign state
List of sovereign states
List of states with limited recognition
Dependent territory
Timeline of historical geopolitical changes
United Nations
Member states of the United Nations
United Nations list of non-self-governing territories

List of IOC country codes
List of CGF country codes

Notes

References

Sources and external links

 ISO 3166 Maintenance Agency, International Organization for Standardization (ISO)
 Country names and code elements — list of alpha-2 codes
 Standard Country or Area Codes for Statistical Use, United Nations Statistics Division
 Countries or areas, codes and abbreviations — list of alpha-3 and numeric codes (a few territories officially assigned codes in ISO 3166-1 are not included in this list)
 The World Factbook (public domain), Central Intelligence Agency
 Appendix D – Country Data Codes — comparison of GEC (formerly FIPS 10-4), ISO 3166, and STANAG 1059 country codes

1
Country codes
Lists of country codes

sv:ISO 3166#ISO 3166-1-koder